Squash is a popular sport in Australia. There is a long tradition of the sport in the country, which boasts 7 former world number one players. As of 2018 there are many highly ranked Australian players, both in men's and women's squash.

History of squash in Australia
The first Squash courts in Australia were established in 1913 at the Melbourne Club in Victoria. Players such as Geoff Hunt, Heather McKay and Sarah Fitz-Gerald are regarded as Australian squash legends.

Professional competitions
Many professional squash competitions take place in Australia each year. For example, the 2017 PSA World Tour included:
 the Sandgate Open in Brisbane
 the Elanora Open in Sydney
 the NT Open in Darwin
 the Golden Open in Kalgoorlie
 the Tasmanian Open in Devonport
 the South Australian Open in Adelaide
 the Victorian Open in Melbourne
 the City of Greater Bendigo International in Bendigo
 the City of Greater Shepparton International in Shepparton
 the Bega Open in Bega
 the North Coast Open in Coffs Harbour
 the New South Wales Open in Thornleigh
 the Queensland Open in the Gold Coast
 the Cairns Squash International in Cairns
 the Australian Open in Darwin

Top players

World number ones
Australia has produced several world number ones:
 Men:
 Geoff Hunt
 Chris Dittmar
 David Palmer
 Women:
 Vicki Cardwell
 Michelle Martin
 Sarah Fitz-Gerald
 Rachael Grinham

Highest ranked players
As of April 2018, the highest ranked Australian squash players were:
 Men:
 Ryan Cuskelly (15)
 Cameron Pilley (20)
 Rex Hedrick (65)
 Joshua Larkin (69)
 Rhys Dowling (98)
 Women:
 Donna Urquhart (16)
 Rachael Grinham (26)
 Christine Nunn (55)
 Sarah Cardwell (56)
 Tamika Saxby (57)

National teams
Australia has national men's and women's teams, that represent the country in international competitions.

Commonwealth Games
Australian players compete in the squash events of the Commonwealth Games, which are held every 4 years. Most recently, in the 2018 games, Australian players Zac Alexander and 
David Palmer won gold in the men's doubles event, Donna Urquhart and Cameron Pilley won gold in the mixed doubles event, and Donna Urquhart and Donna Urquhart won bronze in the women's doubles event.

Governance
Squash in Australia is governed by Squash Australia.

See also
Sport in Australia

References